Mistri, or Mistry, is a term for a master-craftsman, foreman or supervisor of manual workers in India. Mistri is being replaced with "supervisor" and other terms, as for example by the Indian Railway who replaced it with supervisor in 2005.

The word Mistri, or Mistry, is adopted into the Gujarati language from the Portuguese word Mestre meaning Master or Teacher. The Portuguese were present in Gujarat since 1500 in Diu. The Kadias and Kadia Kshatriyas worked on building Diu Fort and the Portuguese called them Mestre due to their skills at fort building.

MistriBabu besides carpenter ( for Suthar community ) also meant Contractor ( mainly for Mistris of Kutch - majority of whom worked as Railway, PWD & Forest Contractors during British India ). Many Parsi family working as Contractor, therefore, also adopted surname Mistry, as their occupational surname. One such famous Parsi businessman is Pallonji Mistry.

The word Mistri or Mistry in Gujarat is today identified with people, who are expert in building construction.

See also
 Gaidher
 Mistry (Surname)
 Mistri (caste)
 Raj Mistry

References

Indian words and phrases
Gujarati language
Linguistic history of India
Indian architectural history